The Association for Computing Machinery's Council on Women in Computing (ACM-W) supports, celebrates, and advocates internationally for the full engagement of women in all aspects of the computing field, providing a wide range of programs and services to ACM members and working in the larger community to advance the contributions of technical women.  ACM-W is an active organization with over 36,000 members.

Celebrations of Women in Computing
ACM-W sponsors annual celebrations focused on women in computing. ACM-W provides up to $3,000 seed funding for each celebration, and also raises and disburses corporate sponsorship. Each celebration organizing committee is responsible for additional fundraising within their conference area. ACM-W supports, celebrates, and advocates internationally for the full engagement of women in all aspects of the computing field, providing a wide range of programs and services to Association for Computing Machinery members and working in the larger community to advance the contributions of technical women.

ACM-W Celebrations are regional conferences with global participants from industry, academia, and government. Celebration participation is growing  and these events represent some of the largest gatherings of women in technology.

The original Grace Hopper Celebration of Women in Computing was recognized by the US White House on their page "The Untold History of Women in Science and Technology" in the entry for United States Navy Rear Admiral Grace Hopper.  In addition to this noteworthy beginning, the conferences have attracted the participation of technology notables including Anita Hill, Chan Zuckerberg Initiative co-founder Priscilla Chan, and Justine Cassell of Carnegie Mellon University, one of the top universities in Computer Science. The list describes the expansion of celebrations globally to include the largest gathering of women in computing in India.

Chapters
ACM-W has nearly 200 active professional, virtual and student chapters globally. The professional chapters serve to enhance communications networks thereby providing resources and support for women in the workforce. The student chapters serve to increase recruitment and retention of women in computing fields at the university level and offer student activities and projects that aim to improve the working and learning environments for women in computing.

Awards
Starting in 2006, ACM-W has offered an annual Athena Lecturer Award to honor outstanding women researchers who have made fundamental contributions to computer science:
 2006–2007: Deborah Estrin of UCLA
 2007–2008: Karen Spärck Jones of University of Cambridge
 2008–2009: Shafi Goldwasser of MIT and the Weitzmann Institute of Science
 2009–2010: Susan J. Eggers of the University of Washington
 2010–2011: Mary Jane Irwin of the Pennsylvania State University
 2011–2012: Judith S. Olson of the University of California, Irvine
 2012–2013: Nancy Lynch of MIT
 2013–2014: Katherine Yelick of LBNL
 2014–2015: Susan Dumais of Microsoft Research
 2015–2016: Jennifer Widom of Stanford University
 2016–2017: Jennifer Rexford of Princeton University
2017–2018: Lydia Kavraki of Rice University
2018–2019: Andrea Goldsmith of Princeton University
2019–2020: Elisa Bertino of Purdue University
2020–2021: Sarit Kraus of Bar-Ilan University 
2021–2022: Ayanna Howard of Ohio State University
2022–2023: Éva Tardos of Cornell University

ACM-W also offers an ACM-W Networking Award for active student chapters.

Scholarships
ACM-W provides support for women undergraduate and graduate students in Computer Science and related programs to attend research conferences. The ACM-W scholarships are offered for both intra-continental conference travel, and intercontinental conference travel. Scholarship applications are evaluated in six groups each year, to distribute awards across a range of conferences, including many annual ACM special interest group conferences such as SIGACCESS, SIGACT, SIGAI, SIGARCH, SIGCOMM, SIGCHI, SIGCSE, SIGDA, SIGECOM, SIGEVO, SIGGRAPH, SIGHPC, SIGIR, SIGITE, SIGMM, SIGMOBILE, SIGOPS, SIGPLAN, and SIGSOFT.

Sponsors
Past sponsors of ACM-W services such as scholarships and regional celebrations include:
 Google
 Microsoft Research
 Oracle Academy
 Two Sigma

Newsletter
ACM-W publishes a monthly newsletter that highlights people, opportunities, accomplishments, and current issues associated with women in computing. The network wide newsletter was started in 2008 with regional newsletters also provided.

Officers
ACM-W officers include:
 Jody Tims, Chair
 Reyyan Ayfer, Vice Chair
 Melanie Wu, Treasurer
 Amelia Cole, Treasurer
Arati Dixit, Standing Committee Chair
 Bushra Anjum, Standing Committee Chair
 Bettina Bair, Communications Committee Chair
 Sarah McRoberts, Communications Committee Chair
 Valerie Barr, Past Chair
ACM-W regions and chairs are: 
Ruth G. Lennon, Europe Chair
 Heena Timani, India Chair
 Monica McGill, North America
 Jacqueline Tate, Asia Pacific
 Hong Gao, China

ACM-W Standing Committees and Special Projects include: 
Viviana Bono, ACM-W Scholarships 
 Pamela Wisniewski, ACM / ACM-W Awards Rising Star
 Rachelle Hippler, Professional Chapters
 Priya Chawla, Next Gen
ACM-W Communications Committee members:

 Jennifer Goodall, ACM-W Connections Newsletter Editor

See also

 Association for Computing Machinery
 CRA-W: Committee on the Status of Women in Computing Research
 List of organizations for women in science
 National Center for Women & Information Technology
 Women in computing

References

External links
 
 Celebrations of Women in Computing
 Women in Computing Oral History Collection
 Anita Borg Institute

Association for Computing Machinery
Information technology organizations
Organizations for women in science and technology
Women in computing
Computer science education